Andrzej Jerzy Szmajke (21 October 1953 – 5 June 2016) –  prominent Polish psychologist, author and professor of humanities (2008). Professor Szmajke researched self-presentation, person perception, and specialized in personality and social psychology. His most significant work concerned the phenomena of self-handicapping, self-presentation, interpersonal attraction, egotism and multiple topics within evolutionary psychology. He was an academic teacher affiliated with University of Wrocław, University School of Physical Education in Wroclaw, and University of Opole. He served as the Director of Institute of Psychology at University of Opole from 2008 until his death. He published more than 90 articles and books, and advised tens of Polish psychological scientists.

References

Polish psychologists
University of Wrocław alumni
Academic staff of the University of Wrocław
Polish culture
Academic staff of the University of Opole
1953 births
2016 deaths
Polish scientists